Bathrooms.com is a British retailer of bathroom goods, such as baths, sinks and toilets, established in 2004. The company is based in Watford, Hertfordshire and employs 50 staff.

Overview
The company estimates that one in fifty British homes contains one or more of its products. In 2013, the company attracted media attention for its decision to "reshore", bringing a larger proportion of its manufacturing back from China to the UK.

References

External links
Official Website
Bathroom Remodel
Bathroom Renovation

Bathroom fixture companies
British companies established in 2004
Retail companies established in 2004
Companies based in Watford
Online retailers of the United Kingdom
Retail companies of England